Esa Juhani Hukkanen (born February 25, 1963 in Lahti) is a former amateur boxer from Finland. He is best known for winning the bronze medal at the 1987 European Championships in Turin, Italy in the Men's Middleweight (– 75 kg) division. He represented his native country at the 1988 Summer Olympics in Seoul, South Korea.

References
sports-reference

1963 births
Living people
Sportspeople from Lahti
Middleweight boxers
Boxers at the 1988 Summer Olympics
Olympic boxers of Finland
Finnish male boxers